This list comprises all players who have participated in at least one league match for Northern Virginia Royals in the USL Premier Development League since the USL began keeping detailed records in 2003. Players who were on the roster but never played a first team game are not listed; players who appeared for the team in other competitions (US Open Cup, etc.) but never actually made an USL appearance are noted at the bottom of the page where appropriate.

A "*" denotes players who are known to have appeared for the team prior to 2003.

A
  Papa Adjei
  Jude Alanwoko
  Taj Alvaranga
  David Ambush
  Mike R Anderson
  Fabio Andrade
  Mike Annagu
  David Atkinson

B
  John Bain
  Joseph Barnd
  Robert Batchelder
  Pierre Bazie
  Salvador Benitez
  Oscar Berrios
  Alejandro Berthe-Suarez
  Matt Brady
  Chris Bresnahan
  Dustin Bond

C
  Garland Cannon
  Julian Cantillo
  Michael Caro
  Chris Carroll
  Patrick Carroll
  Oscar Cavero
  Julian Chang
  Chris Chaves
  Manuel Chavez
  Adam Chidester
  Jeffery Cullina

D
  James Davin
  Jon Dawson
  Dylan Dempsey
  Chernor Diallo
  Shawn Dixon
  Scott Donnelly
  Eric Dougnaglo
  Joshua Dunn
  Steven Duran
  Chris Dykstra

E
  Richard Edgar
  Kevin Edwards
  Ekom Etuk
  Jelani Evering

F
  Alexander Fercz
  Mike Foss
  Victor Freeman
  Jonathan Frias

G
  Josie George
  Donald Gibson
  Seth Goldman
  Philip Gordon
  Glenn Gray
  Michael Green
  Andrew Gretton
  Max Griessbach
  Francisco Guaita-Munoz
  Michael Guckian
  Ulrich Gueret-M'Poko
  Carlos Guevara

H
  Eli Hajjar
  Alexander Hall
  Ty Hall
  Anthony Han
  Andrew Harvey
  Joel Helmick
  Matt Henson
  Zane Hill
  Brian Hinkey
  Alex Horwath
  Didi Houessou
  Yu Hoshide
  Brant Hovington
  Karl Hudson
  Maurice Hughes
  Ronnie Hunte
  Davorin Husadzinovic
  Kevin Huylebroeck

I
  Jose Icochea
  Aly Ipolite
  Abdul Ismail

J
  Brian James
  Ryan Jenkins

K
  Ben Kamara
  Ishmail Kamara
  Mbamba Kamara
  Nikolaj Kapus
  Stanley Kaweesi Katongole
  Sean Kelley
  Brion Kelly
  Andrew Keszler
  Andrew Kish
  Ryan Kish

L
  Phillip Lathaur
  Travis Leger
  Adam Lobene
  Harry Lockwood
  Daniel Lucas

M
  Greg Macnamara
  Gary Malebranche
  James Mallon
  Mike Marino
  Ernesto Marquez
  Eber Martinez
  Irvin Martinez
  Francis McCardle
  Chris McClugherty
  Nicolas McMorris
  Jerry McNeal
  Anthony McPeak
  Whitney Minnis
  Dave Mitchell
  Elvis Mnyamuru
  Tom Conrad Morris
  Zane Morrison

N
  Said Nabih
  Conor Neusel
  Arthur Nhliziyo
  David Noyes

O
  Matthew O'Connor
  Leroy Oligie
  Ryan Olsen
  Sean O'Reilly
  Matthew Osborne
  Eric Otero

P
  Troy Perkins*
  Otis Pitney
  Scott Pohlman
  Paul Portal-Pinillos
  Will Proctor
  Chris Pruden

Q
  Sergio Quinteros

R
  Luca Rassenti
  Grady Renfrow
  Reginald Rivers
  Oscar Roa
  Jonahan Romero
  Dwayne Roseway
  Aaron Ross
  Blake Roth
  Eric Russell

S
  Sergio Salas*
  Omar Samaha
  Ken Savittiere
  Joseph Schoenbauer
  Chris Segaar
  Christopher Serrano
  Ronnie Shaban
  James Shannon
  Seth Shaw
  A. J. Sheta
  Kareem Sheta
  Marc Smith
  Benjaman Stephan
  James Stevens
  Patrick Stevens
  Seth Stoner
  Richard Strong
  Patrick (Paddy) Sweeney
  Nick Sylvester

T
  Kenneth Taylor
  Brett Thomas
  Chris Thomas
  Joseph Torogiwa
  Aladino Torres
  Alieu Touray-Saidy
  Stephen Tupy

V
  James Vandenhurk
  Christopher Vita

W
  Steven Wagoner
  Chris Walt
  Parker Walton
  Zach Ward
  Doug Warren*
  Jan Weeg
  Steven Weiss
  Christopher Werner
  Josh Whitham
  Adam Wilson
  Nate Wilson
  Mark Wysocki

Y
  Dor Yasur
  Yared Yedenekachew
  Irad Young

Z
  Eric Zuehsow

Sources

2010 Northern Virginia Royals stats
2009 Northern Virginia Royals stats
2008 Northern Virginia Royals stats
2007 Northern Virginia Royals stats
2006 Northern Virginia Royals stats
2005 Northern Virginia Royals stats
2004 Northern Virginia Royals stats
2003 Northern Virginia Royals stats

References

Northern Virginia Royals
 
Association football player non-biographical articles